eSchoolView is a content management system and website developer based in Columbus, Ohio. The company’s clients include public, private, and charter school institutions. Rob O’Leary and Grant Wright founded eSchoolView in 2008.

History
In 2008, Rob O’Leary and Grant Wright founded eSchoolView. eSchoolView held its “Investing in Our Future,” a scholarship for high school seniors, competition in December 2013. That month, the company pledged $35,000 towards student scholarships.

During the 2013-2014 school year, eSchoolView partnered with Hannah Ashton Middle School in Reynoldsburg, Ohio to create a coding class for eighth grade students. In April 2014, eSchoolView launched its first “tailor-made” website in Iowa. Later that year, eSchoolView was listed on District Administration’s “Readers' Choice Top 100 Products.”

The company was listed as No. 1409 on Inc. Magazine's Inc. 5000 index of fastest growing U.S. companies that year. By June 2014, the company served over 200 Ohio school districts and 1,300 educational organizations in 31 states. In 2015, eSchooView's sustained growth was again recognized and was named 1907 on Inc. Magazine's 5000 list. In October 2015, eSchoolView was featured in District Administration magazine as a provider of K12 websites.

References

Companies based in the Columbus, Ohio metropolitan area
Internet properties established in 2008
2008 establishments in Ohio
American educational websites